The Beeliar Wetlands is a wetland located in the southwest portion of Western Australia. It is made up of two chains of lakes and wetlands that run parallel to the west coast of Australia. They are situated on the Swan Coastal Plain between the Darling Escarpment and the Indian Ocean. Beeliar was the name given to the area by the Aboriginal people that lived and hunted in the area.

The lakes in this chain are mostly saline and often described as "seasonal" because they often dry up during summer months. The Beeliar Wetlands are located in the southwest portion of the metropolitan area of Perth, Western Australia. The northernmost point is located in the suburb of Mount Pleasant, just south of the Swan River.

The state government has incorporated the remnants of the wetlands, including some 19 lakes and numerous other wetlands, into the Beeliar Regional Park, which is managed by its Department of Environment and Conservation. The park comprises a number of separate portions, and is not one contiguous expanse of land.

Location and geography 
When Beeliar Nyungar controlled the areas, they lived alongside the wetlands now within the bounds of the metropolitan area. To this day there are sixteen Aboriginal campsites within the metropolitan area, predominately located on "the banks of North and Bibra Lakes". Beeliar Nyungar created many well-used trails to and from watering holes, which became "the main transport routes between the Murray and Swan River Nyungar Groups and the area was an important place of trade activity for Aboriginal people".

History and recognition 
The area around Cockburn was colonized in 1829 when European settlers first arrived, however only in the 1890s did the City of Cockburn start growing rapidly and undergoing urbanisation. “Cockburn has evolved into a fast-growing local government area.” The rich history of Cockburn dates back 40,000 years. The Beeliar Nyungar people have very strong cultural and historical ties to The City of Cockburn and feel a deep-rooted connection to the natural areas of the city.

Aboriginal context 
"Nyungar" is a general term used to describe any clan that lived “in the south-west of Western Australia”; currently there are thirteen groups of Aboriginal clans still living in the area, one of which is referred to as the Whadjuk and:

These tribes have always contributed to trading in the area as a means of gathering needed materials. These clans “went as far as Uluru and the center of Australia” and vice versa from the Indigenous groups in these areas.

Aboriginal use 
The Beeliar clan are the traditional owners of the land before settlers arrived; they are one of the many Whadjuk clans living in and around the area that would become the Perth metropolitan region. Ancestors of the clan believe that their spirits will always be linked to the nature of the Cockburn land. Ancient stories left by the Nyungar clan state that the city's many connected wetlands are represented by a rainbow serpent, referred to as the Waakal. This was known to be the wetlands modern views as the serpent weaves through Fremantle to Mandurah, where the wetlands are. “The Waakal creates the shape of the Boodjar, over, under and through the earth and gives foundation to the meaning of life in Cockburn.”

Aboriginal history 
In Australia, Aboriginal history stretches “well over 40,000 years”. In Western Australia the Nyungar people used to control and live on this land during that time. The name Nyungar is given to anyone who “occupied and continue to occupy the whole South West” of Western Australia. The word Nyungar is accepted as the meaning for "people" or "person" in the indigenous language; common modern spellings include "Noongar", "Nyungah" and "Nyoongar", however they all translate to the same meaning. The Beeliar people were “one of the clans of Whadjuk group of Nyungar”. Beeliar was later found to translate to "river people" as the tribe used to occupy the land nearest to the river, the land we now know as the City of Cockburn is where the Beeliar used to live; they referred to is as Beeliar Boodjar, "boodjar" meaning country. “Words in the Nyungar language can be written in many different ways due to regional dialectic differences and the absence of a common orthography.”

Nature 

The Beeliar land is known for its extensive wetland system throughout the Cockburn area. These wetlands have always been valued by the locals as they have always held great spiritual significance for the Nyungar people. This land was also valued for its ability to provide food, medical and manufacturing resources.  

The Beeliar land is often referred to as "Beeliar Boodjar", "Boodjar" being the Noongar word for "land"; this land is still frequently visited by Nyungar people. When the Indigenous tribes controlled this land it had two main campsites: the “Coolbellup (North Lake) and Walliabup (Bibra Lake). Nyunagr continued camping in the Cockburn area through the 1980s.” To fulfil social and cultural obligations, the Beeliar Nyungar and other Nyungar clans used well established trails that linked wetlands together.

Roe 8 damage
The extension to Roe Highway known as Roe 8 had been planned to pass through the Beeliar Wetlands. There had been significant opposition to the highway, including legal challenges and public protests. Work on the project was suspended after a change of government in the March 2017 state election, with the incoming Labor government intending to cancel the project.

 a group of volunteers have begun spreading mulchfrom the woodchipped original treesas the first steps toward restoring the cleared area.
 
The Beeliar area is previously owned by the Beeliar people, therefore it has become very important to the community to preserve this land. The land of The Beeliar Land hold great significance to the original owners and their ancestors and is viewed as having great education factors for new generations, therefore any damage to this land cause some emotional distress to locals. “The plan has met with years of protests by local government, environmentalists and residents who are concerned about the economic, social and environmental issues associated with the development.” A large issue people had was the damage caused by a plan to build the highway, Roe 8, the damage that building this highway would cause would take decades to restore. "Work on the first stage of the $1.9 billion Perth Freight Link, an extension of Roe Highway across the wetlands, stopped just 24 hours after the Liberal-National alliance lost power in a landslide election defeat.” After being made to halt work “Opponents to the federal-backed Perth Freight Link have vowed to take their fight to the High Court after the WA government won an appeal to reverse a decision that invalidated environmental approval for the $1.9 billion project.” The plan for the highway is to cut through the spiritual lands of the Beeliar wetlands but conservationists have their arms up ready to stop the first stage of work. The case that halted work on the highway case referred to as "Jacob v save Beeliar Wetlands":

“Martin CJ 's judgment in Save Beeliar Wetlands v Jacob created a significant degree of uncertainty for many state departments and statutory bodies. The primary implication being that published policies were potentially mandatory relevant considerations in their administrative decision-making processes. It presaged the urgent review of many such policies to avoid future challenges from similarly 'disgruntled parties'."

See also
 Wanneroo wetlands

References

External links
 Beeliar Regional Park, Urban Bushland Council of WA
 Beeliar Regional Park and Adjacent Areas, Department of the Environment

Swan Coastal Plain
Beeliar Regional Park
Wetlands of Western Australia